FLM may refer to:
 F.L.M. (album), 1987 album by Mel and Kim
 "F.L.M." (song), the album's title track
 Ceramica Flaminia, a defunct cycling team
 Family Life Ministries, an American Christian organization, operator of the Family Life Network of radio stations
 Filadelfia Airport, in Paraguay
 Financial Literacy Month, in the United States
 First Look Media, an American news organization
 Flimby railway station, in England
 FLM Aviation, a defunct German airline
 FLM Panelcraft, a British coachbuilder
 Flora London Marathon
 Focal length multiplier
 Formula Le Mans
 Fun Little Movies, an American film production company
 Macina Liberation Front
 Malagasy Lutheran Church